Tirzah was a town in the Samarian highlands northeast of Shechem; it is generally identified with the site of Tell el-Far'ah (North), northeast of modern city of Nablus, in the immediate vicinity of the Palestinian village of Wadi al-Far'a and the Far'a refugee camp, although Conder and Kitchener suggested that the ancient city may have actually been where Tayasir is now located, based on its phonemes. Conversely, biblical researchers, Robinson and Guérin, suggested identifying the town with Talluza.

History
The archaeological site is called Tell el-Far'ah (North) in order to distinguish it from Tell el-Far'ah (South), an archaeological site south of Gaza.

Excavations were undertaken at Tell el-Far'ah between 1946 and 1960 for nine seasons by École Biblique under the direction of Roland de Vaux.

Prehistoric period 
The site was occupied in the Neolithic and Chalcolithic eras, and became progressively more populated. Finds from the earliest levels of settlement excavated by Dorothy Garrod in 1928 were suggested to date to the Pre-Pottery Neolithic B (PPNB) period.

Bronze Age 
During the Early Bronze Age, Tell el-Far'ah had ramparts and domestic housing units. The earliest pottery oven of its kind was excavated here; it had two chambers that allowed separation between the vessels being fired and the open flame. This type of pottery oven continued to be used in the region until the Roman period. A temple and an olive press were also uncovered. Town planning is clearly evident at the site. The western gate in the town wall was rebuilt several times during this period. The excavations indicate developing urbanization and the presence of new populations. However, the town was abandoned in the middle of the third millennium BCE, and remained so for approximately 600 years.

In the Middle Bronze Age II, there was a small settlement on the site that used the remnants of the older town walls for protection. In the 1700s the population expanded and a new wall was built, but it enclosed a smaller area than the older city. The Late Bronze Age remains indicate that there was no major urban development during this period.

Iron Age 
Tell el-Far'ah was an important town in the early Iron Age, the center of a network of villages, one of five such networks that make up the Israelite settlement, starting around 1200 BCE, in the highlands between Jerusalem and the Jezreel Valley. Excavations from the Iron Age levels have produced numerous artifacts, including various figurines, arrowheads, spindle whorls, a model sanctuary, and Four room houses. The figurines include cow heads, cows nursing calves, horses, tambourine players, and figurines representing Asherah.

In the Bible
The town of Tirzah is first mentioned in the Bible in the Book of Joshua, as having had a king whom the Israelites defeated. it is not mentioned again until after the period of the United Monarchy.

During the time of King Jeroboam, Tirzah is mentioned as the place where Abijah, son of Jeroboam, died as a result of illness. Later Tirzah is described as a capital of the northern kingdom of Israel during the reigns of Baasha, Elah, Zimri and Omri. The royal palace at Tirzah was set on fire by Zimri when he was faced with having to surrender to Omri. Omri reigned from Tirzah for six years after which he moved Israel's capital to Samaria.

Tirzah is mentioned in when Menahem left it to Samaria, assassinated King Shallum and became King of Israel.

Tirzah is mentioned in Song of Songs, where the lover compares his beloved's beauty to that of Tirzah. If the authorship of Song of Songs can be attributed to Solomon, then this is a reference to the city during the United Monarchy. However, Song of Songs provides no definite historical context to allow it to be dated on that basis.

Modern location
Robinson suggested that Talluza might be ancient Tirzah (Latin form: Thersa), one of 31 Canaanite cities which the Bible lists as having been conquered by Joshua; the modern Arabic name being a derivation of the ancient name by way of its Hebrew form, or possibly its original Canaanite form, whereby the r sound was replaced with a l. French explorer Victor Guérin also argued that Talluza was the site of ancient Thirza. 
Later, Conder and Kitchener suggested that Tayasir was a more likely candidate; however, today Tell el-Farah (North), northeast of modern Nablus is generally accepted as the site of Tirzah.

References

Bibliography

 

Canaanite cities
Archaeological sites in the West Bank
Archaeological sites in Samaria
Torah cities
Bronze Age Asia
Iron Age Asia
Bronze Age sites in the State of Palestine
Iron Age sites in Asia
Kingdom of Israel (Samaria)
Zimri (king)